FC Lyubimets is a Bulgarian football club based in Lyubimets. The team was founded in 1921 and re-founded in 2007. They currently compete in the Bulgarian fourth tier, the Regional Football League of Haskovo.  

The club’s biggest achievement came in 2013, when Lyubimets managed to promote to the A Group for the first time in club history for the 2013–14 season. Lyubimets was relegated, however, and is yet to return to the top level.
 
The club's home ground is the local Municipal Stadium in Lyubimets, which has an overall capacity of 4,000 seats.

History
The first club was founded as Football Club Maritsa in 1921. In 1947 the club changed its name to Football Club Strela. In the 1960s the club was finally named Football Club Lyubimets. The club participated in the third and fourth divisions of Bulgarian football for the majority of its history, before being dissolved by the end of the 1993–94 season.

In 2007, thirteen years later, the club was restored as Football Club Lyubimets 2007. In its first season, the club was promoted for the first time to the second division. In its first season in professional football, the club finished in 7th place.

On 9 January 2013, club's former player Veselin Velikov was announced as the new manager. Four months later he led Lyubimets to promotion to the A PFG for first time in the club's history, finishing in 2nd place in the B PFG.

The maiden season in the professional top-flight began with a 1-0 win over defending champions Ludogorets Razgrad, a big surprise in Bulgarian football. Lyubimets went on to earn 9 points from their first four games, including wins against Lokomotiv Sofia and Europa League participants Botev Plovdiv (2-1 away in Plovdiv). The team’s form dropped after the fifth round, however, as it managed to win only one of their next 18 games in the first phase. This placed them in the relegation group for the remainder of the season. In the relegation round, they won only one of twelve possible matches, and were relegated to the B PFG, after finishing last. 

In the summer of 2014, the BFU decided to refuse to give FC Lyubimets a license for the second league, similarly to the other teams relegated that year from the first tier, Neftochimic and Pirin Gotse Delchev. This was done mainly because of financial reasons, as Lyubimets could not provide enough financial resources to sustain themselves in professional football. Lyubimets was subsequently relegated to the fourth tier, the regional league of Haskovo. The team returned to the third tier after two seasons in the fourth division, but was relegated immediately.

League positions

Honours
Bulgarian A Group
14th place  2013–14
Bulgarian B Group
Runners-up: 2012–13

Current squad

Managerial history 
After restored
<div style="font-size:100%">

Notable stats
After the club was restored in 2007

Notes:
Bold signals active players
Correct as of 2013-06-10

Past seasons

References

External links
Official Club Website 
Lyubimetz 2007 at bgclubs.eu 

Lyubimetz 2007
1921 establishments in Bulgaria